A list of notable actors from Slovenia:

Lenore Aubert
Maks Bajc
Miha Baloh
Matija Barl
Polde Bibič
Demeter Bitenc
Yuri Bradac
Sebastian Cavazza
Janez Drozg
Emil Filipčič
Jure Godler
Nina Ivanišin
Jure Ivanušič
Tomi Janežič
Polona Juh
Ida Kravanja
Iztok Mlakar
Peter Musevski
Radko Polič
Branko Pintarič
Tanja Ribič
Stane Sever
Vladimir Skrbinsek
Bert Sotlar
Mira Stupica
Jernej Šugman
Zlatko Šugman
Saša Tabaković
Aliash Tepina
Stevo Žigon
Dragan Živadinov
Jonas Žnidaršič
Katarina Čas

 
Actor
Slovenian